α-Farnesene synthase (EC 4.2.3.46, (E,E)-α-farnesene synthase, AFS1, MdAFS1) is an enzyme with systematic name (2E,6E)-farnesyl-diphosphate lyase ((3E,6E)-α-farnesene-forming). This enzyme catalyses the following chemical reaction

 (2E,6E)-farnesyl diphosphate  (3E,6E)-α-farnesene + diphosphate

References

External links 
 

EC 4.2.3